McCurdy Building, also known as the Sears, Roebuck and Company Building, is a historic commercial building located in downtown Evansville, Indiana. It was built in 1920, and is a four-story brick building.  The first floor features large display windows framed with limestone pilasters. A two-story addition was constructed in 1937, later raised to four stories in 1946.  A two-story limestone faced addition, known as The Annex, was constructed in 1943.  In 1925, it was occupied by the first Sears store to operate as a direct retail business independent of a catalog department.

It was added to the National Register of Historic Places in 1979.

References

Sears Holdings buildings and structures
Commercial buildings on the National Register of Historic Places in Indiana
Commercial buildings completed in 1920
Buildings and structures in Evansville, Indiana
National Register of Historic Places in Evansville, Indiana
1920 establishments in Indiana